Frederick William Mulley, Baron Mulley, PC (3 July 1918 – 15 March 1995) was a British Labour politician, barrister-at-law and economist.

Early life
Mulley attended Warwick School between 1929 and 1936. He served in the Worcestershire Regiment in the Second World War, reaching the rank of sergeant, but was captured in 1940 and spent five years as a prisoner of war in Germany. During this time he obtained a BSc in economics from University of London as an external student and became a chartered secretary.

At the end of the war, he received an adult scholarship to Christ Church, Oxford, and after a brief spell on an economics fellowship at the University of Cambridge (1948–50) he trained as a barrister, being called to the Bar in 1954.

Parliamentary career
Mulley had been a member of the Labour Party since 1936 and at the 1945 general election he unsuccessfully contested the constituency of Sutton Coldfield. He became Member of Parliament for Sheffield Park in 1950, a position he held until deselected by his local party prior to the 1983 general election, when his constituency disappeared in a redistribution of boundaries.

During a long career in politics Mulley held many ministerial positions including Minister of Aviation (1965–67), Minister for Disarmament (1967–69), and Minister of Transport (1969–70, 1974–75). While at the Transport Ministry he believed it would be inappropriate to be seen to be a car driver. Although he owned an Austin Maxi, his wife was the sole user of it during this period.

In 1975 Harold Wilson brought him into the Cabinet as Secretary of State for Education and Science, and in 1976 became Secretary of State for Defence.

He fell asleep during the Queen's Jubilee Review of the Royal Air Force at RAF Finningley in 1977 when there was considerable noise around him. Having a small sleep during exercise was referred to by members of the RAF as having a "Fred Mulley". It was suggested in Private Eye that Mulley was guilty of treason (then still a capital offence) for having slept with the Queen.

House of Lords
After retiring from the House of Commons in 1983, he was created a life peer as Baron Mulley, of Manor Park in the City of Sheffield on 30 January 1984, and he held a variety of directorial positions.

Legacy
A main road in the Lower Don Valley in Sheffield is named after him.

References

External links 

|-

|-

|-

|-

|-

1918 births
1995 deaths
Military personnel from Warwickshire
Alumni of Christ Church, Oxford
Alumni of St Catharine's College, Cambridge
Alumni of University of London Worldwide
Alumni of the University of London
Association of Professional, Executive, Clerical and Computer Staff-sponsored MPs
British Army personnel of World War II
British Secretaries of State for Education
Chairs of the Labour Party (UK)
Labour Party (UK) MPs for English constituencies
Labour Party (UK) life peers
Members of the Privy Council of the United Kingdom
Ministers in the Wilson governments, 1964–1970
People educated at Warwick School
Secretaries of State for Defence (UK)
Secretaries of State for Transport (UK)
UK MPs 1950–1951
UK MPs 1951–1955
UK MPs 1955–1959
UK MPs 1959–1964
UK MPs 1964–1966
UK MPs 1966–1970
UK MPs 1970–1974
UK MPs 1974
UK MPs 1974–1979
UK MPs 1979–1983
Worcestershire Regiment soldiers
World War II prisoners of war held by Germany
British World War II prisoners of war
Life peers created by Elizabeth II